Keenan Angelo Arrison (born 23 February 1981), is a South African actor, director, voice artist and singer. He is best known for the roles in the television serials such as; The Wild, After 9, and Shooting Stars.

Personal life
Arrison was born on 23 February 1981 in Cape Town, South Africa. He is a BA degree graduate in Live Performance and Motion Picture from AFDA, The School for the Creative Economy.

Career
In 2006, he wrote and directed two short films: Ongeriewe and Freedom Days, where the former was a Cannes-nominated piece. In 2007, he played the role "Roland" in the SABC1 drama series Divers Down. In the same year, he joined with the e.tv soccer drama Shooting Stars and played the role of "Clinton Arendse". His role received popularity where he continued to play the role until the conclusion of the third season in 2010. In 2009, he made film debut with Shirley Adams and played the role "Donovan Adams". After that, he appeared in the M-Net soap opera The Wild with the lead role of "Ashwin Fernandez" in 2011. In 2012, he reprised his role from the first season.

In 2013, Keenan made a minor role as "Doctor" in the second season of the SABC1 drama series Skeem Saam. In the same year, he joined with the SABC1 drama series After 9 and played the lead role "Zane Matthews" in the second season. In the next year, he appeared in three television serials: SABC2 mystery thriller Swartwater with the role "Vincent", SABC1 anthology miniseries When We Were Black with the role "Shaheed Aziz" and M-Net Edge drama fantasy Dominion with the role "Brother Paul".

In 2016, he made the supportive role "James" in the kykNET police procedural Die Byl. Then in 2017, he joined with another kykNET drama serial Sara se Geheim with the role "Danny", and continued in the second season as well. In 2018, he acted in the Hollywood adventure film Tomb Raider. In 2019, he appeared in the M-Net miniseries Trackers and played the role "Ibrahim November". In 2020, he acted in the serials: Siende Blind with role "Ricky" and The Riviera with role "Naz Isaacs". In 2021, he joined with the cast of seventeenth season of popular kykNET soap opera Binnelanders.

Filmography

References

External links
 IMDb

1981 births
Living people
South African male film actors
South African male television actors
South African male stage actors
Male actors from Cape Town